The 2016–17 FA Women's Premier League Plate is the third running of the competition, which began in 2014. It is the secondary League Cup competition run by the FA Women's Premier League (FA WPL), and is run in parallel with the league's primary League Cup competition, the Premier League Cup.

The teams that take part in the WPL plate are decided after the determining round of the WPL Cup. The winners of determining round matches continue in the WPL Cup, while the losers move into the WPL Plate.

All 72 Premier League clubs were included in the determining round draw, two of whom (Forest Green Rovers and Nuneaton Town) withdrew from the competition before playing a match, meaning 36 teams progressed in the Cup and 34 were entered in the Plate.

Reigning champions Coventry United, who beat Enfield Town 5–1 in the 2015–16 final, won their determining Round match this season, meaning that they did not defend their title.

Results
All results listed are published by The Football Association. Games are listed by round in chronological order, and then in alphabetical order of the home team where matches were played simultaneously.

The division each team play in is indicated in brackets after their name: (S)=Southern Division; (N)=Northern Division; (SW1)=South West Division One; (SE1)=South East Division One; (M1)=Midlands Division One; (N1)=Northern Division One.

First round
Due to there being 34 teams in the competition, two first round matches are required to eliminate two teams and allow a full single-elimination knockout tournament to take place.

Second round

Third round

Quarter-finals

Semi-finals

Final

References

FA Women's National League Plate
Prem